Yakub Guznej or Jakub Guzney (born 1892 in the Russian Empire - ?) was a Belarusian socio-political and military leader. He was a member of the Slutsk Defence Action in 1920, and commander of the first company in the First Brigade of the Army for the Belarusian People's Republic.

References

1892 births
Russian military personnel
Year of death missing